Alva Svennbeck (born 11 October 2000) is a Swedish rhythmic gymnast. She represents her country in international competitions.

Personal life 
Svennbeck is studying civil engineering at Hermods AB in Sweden. In 2021, Alva won the Uppsala Municipality Elite Sports Scholarship of SEK 40,000, she aspires to become a coach after retiring from competition.

Career 
Alva debuted internationally at the 2019 World Cup in Sofia, she was 66th in the All-Around, 64th with hoop, 61st with ball, 65th with clubs and 66th with ribbon. She was later selected for the World Championships in Baku along Cassandra Pettersson and Meja Engdahl, they ranked 39th in teams and Svennbeck took the 104th place in the All-Around and was 106th with hoop, 85th with ball, 133rd with clubs and 132nd with ribbon. The next year she earned a bronze in teams in the 2020 Nordic Rhythmic Gymnastics Championships in Kristianstad.

In 2022 she competed at the World Cup in Pamplona ending ranked 29th in the All-Around and being 33rd with hoop, 29th with ball, 25th with clubs and 24th with ribbon. A month later she represented Sweden with Emma Goeransson and Elina Sheremey at the European Championships in Tel Aviv, she was 56th in the All-Around, 56th with hoop, 55th with ball, 56th with clubs and 57th with ribbon. In September she participated at the World Championships in Sofia where she was 62nd in the All-Around, 50th with hoop, 69th with ball, 69th with clubs and 57th with ribbon.

Routine music information

References 

2000 births
Living people
Swedish rhythmic gymnasts
People from Uppsala
Sportspeople from Uppsala